Pteris cretica, the Cretan brake, ribbon fern, or Cretan brake fern, is a species of evergreen fern in the family Pteridaceae, native to Europe, Asia and Africa.

Description
It has arching pinnate fronds each bearing up to five pinnae.

Cultivation
Pteris cretica is cultivated widely by plant nurseries. It is used in gardens in the ground and as a potted plant, and as a houseplant. The variety with variegated foliage, Pteris cretica var. albolineata, is also widely used, brightening shade gardens.

Both types thrive year round outdoors in subtropical climates, such as California.

The species, and the variety P. cretica var. albolineata (syn. P. nipponica), have both gained the Royal Horticultural Society's Award of Garden Merit.

A relictual presence is certificated in the Italian peninsula Lazio (Ponte Terra gorge, San Vittorino, Rome).

References

External links

cretica
Ferns of Africa
Ferns of Asia
Ferns of Europe
Flora of Crete
Garden plants of Africa
Garden plants of Asia
Garden plants of Europe
House plants
Taxa named by Carl Linnaeus